Dana Levenberg is an American politician who is a member of the New York State Assembly from the 95th district since 2023. First elected in 2022, she previously served as the Town Supervisor of Ossining.

Career 
Levenberg began her career working in advertising and TV production. Later, she served on the Ossining School Board and as Assemblywoman Sandy Galef's chief of staff. Levenberg was first elected to public office as Town Supervisor of the Town of Ossining in 2015.

In 2022, Galef announced she would be retiring from the New York State Assembly at the end of the year, and Levenberg entered the race to succeed her. Galef quickly endorsed her. In the Democratic primary, Levenberg won in a 3-way race against former Peekskill Common Council member and democratic socialist Vanessa Agudelo as well as Westchester County Legislator Colin Smith. In the general election, Levenberg ran against Republican Stacy Halper, a retired music teacher from Briarcliff Manor.

Electoral history

Ossining Town Supervisor

New York Assembly

References

External links 
 New York State Assembly: Dana Levenberg

21st-century American politicians
21st-century American women politicians
Democratic Party members of the New York State Assembly
Legislators from Westchester County, New York
Living people
Town supervisors in New York (state)
Politicians from Westchester County, New York
Women state legislators in New York (state)
Year of birth missing (living people)